The Buccaneer 200 is an American trailerable sailboat, that was designed by Alan Payne and first built in 1974.

The Buccaneer 200 is a development of the Columbia T-23 design, using the same tooling to build the hull.

Production
The boat was built by Bayliner Marine Corporation in the United States starting in 1974, but it is now out of production.

Design

The Buccaneer 200 is a small recreational keelboat, built predominantly of fiberglass, with wood trim. It has a masthead sloop rig, a transom-hung rudder and a fixed long shoal-draft keel. It displaces  and carries  of ballast.

It is normally fitted with a small outboard motor for docking and maneuvering. The cabin is small but includes a double berth, a quarter berth, galley with a sink and a fold down table.

Operational history
In a 2010 review Steve Henkel wrote, "Best features: The competition in this size and weight range was fierce in the 1970s, and to clearly differentiate their product, Bayliner went for low price, a wide beam for plenty of space below, and a simple-to-use boat. Then, as now, this attracted the non-sailing public as buyers. Neophyte sailors found a vessel with a low first cost, and a shallow keel for easy launching and retrieving on a trailer ramp. The long keel also enables the hull to track well under power or when going downwind ... Worst features: The new sailors would also find eventually that a boat with a shallow keel tends to side-slip when sailing upwind in a light to moderate breeze. A long, narrow centerboard housed within the keel (such as on the Chrysler 20) would have eliminated that shortcoming, but would raise the price and complicate sailing."

See also

List of sailing boat types

Related development
Buccaneer 210

Similar sailboats
Cal 20
Com-Pac Sunday Cat
Chrysler 20
Drascombe Lugger
Drascombe Scaffie
Halman 20
Hunter 18.5
Hunter 19-1
Hunter 19 (Europa)
Mercury 18
Naiad 18
Paceship 20
Sandpiper 565
Sanibel 18
Santana 20
Siren 17

References

External links

Keelboats
1970s sailboat type designs
Sailing yachts
Trailer sailers
Sailboat type designs by Alan Payne
Sailboat types built by Buccaneer Yachts